Eilikrina (Greek: Ειλικρινά, English: Sincerely) may refer to:

Music

Albums
 Eilikrina (Elli Kokkinou album), 2007 album by Greek singer Elli Kokkinou.
 Eilikrina (Nikos Oikonomopoulos album), 2013 album by Greek singer Nikos Oikonomopoulos.